The 2021 Chinese Women's Football Championship was the 30th edition of the Chinese Women's Football Championship. It was held from 25 March to 7 April 2021 at Haigeng Football Base in Kunming.

First round

Group A

Group B

Group C

Group D

Group E

Ranking of runner-up teams
To determine the five best runner-up teams, the following criteria were used:
 Points (3 points for a win, 1 point for a draw, 0 points for a loss)
 Goal difference
 Goals scored
 Fair play points
 Drawing of lots

Final round

1–8th classification playoffs

Quarter-finals

5th–8th-place play-offs

Semi-finals

7th–8th-place play-offs

5th–6th-place play-offs

3rd–4th-place play-offs

Final

9–16th classification playoffs

9th–16th-place play-offs

13th–16th-place play-offs

9th–12th-place play-offs

15th–16th-place play-offs

13th–14th-place play-offs

11th–12th-place play-offs

9th–10th-place play-offs

Notes

References

2021 in Chinese football